India's Next Top Model is an Indian reality television series, which premiered on 19 July 2015 and broadcast on MTV India. The series is an Indian version of Tyra Banks-created 2003 American reality television series America's Next Top Model. The viewers see several women compete for the title of India's Next Top Model, providing them with an opportunity to begin their career in the modeling industry.

The Head judge/Host of the series is Lisa Haydon later Malaika Arora, Judged by Dabboo Ratnani, Milind Soman (Season 3-4) And mentored by image consultant and grooming expert Neeraj Gaba and Anusha Dandekar. Bulldog Media & Entertainment had licensed the format rights from CBS Television Distribution and the series was premiered on 19 July 2015 on MTV India.

The show got rebooted into a new format in 2018 named Top Model India (season 1)  in Colors Infinity, sister channel of MTV India that included both men and women competing for the title whereas MTV (Indian TV channel) created a new version for female only models named MTV Supermodel of the Year

Judges and mentors

Cycles

See also

Top Model India
MTV Supermodel of the Year

References

External links

2015 Indian television series debuts
Indian reality television series
MTV original programming
Hindi-language television shows
Indian television series based on American television series
Top Model
MTV (Indian TV channel) original programming